The Qurnah disaster was a May 1855 shipwreck at Al-Qurnah (modern Iraq), at the confluence point of the Tigris and Euphrates rivers. It represents one of the most high profile disasters in the history of archaeology.

The disaster took place during a period of civil unrest, during a period of fighting between the Al-Muntafiq confederation and the Ottoman Empire. The fighting ended with an Al-Muntafiq leader being appointed as provincial governor and tax farmer by the Ottomans, creating problems with the tribes not allied to their confederation.

Background
Excavations at Dur-Sharrukin were being carried out by the new French consul, Victor Place, and in 1855 another shipment of antiquities was ready to be sent back to Paris.  Antiquities from Rawlinson's expedition to Kuyunjik and Fresnel's to Babylon were subsequently added to the shipment. 

Place, who was French consul at Mosul, was unable to attend the shipment himself, as he had been summoned to his new consular post in Moldavia due to the ongoing Crimean War.  

He appointed a Swiss professor named A. Clément as his consular agent and to manage the shipment.

Cargo
A cargo ship and four rafts were prepared to carry the artifacts, but even this substantial effort was over-whelmed by the sheer number of items to be transported.  The cargo included:  
 2 winged, human-headed Lamassu bulls, weighing almost 30 tonnes each
 2 winged genies, weighing almost 13 tonnes each
 Over 150 crates of all dimensions, including basalt and alabaster statues, bas-reliefs, and many inscribed objects in iron, bronze, gold and silver
The cargo which survived the disaster was:
 1 bull
 1 winged genie 
 20-28 twenty crates containing bas-reliefs

Disaster
The troubles began once the convoy left Baghdad in May 1855, as the banks of the river Tigris were controlled by local sheikhs who were hostile to the Ottoman authorities and frequently raided shipping sailing by.  During the journey, the convoy was boarded several times, forcing the crew to relinquish most of their money and supplies in order to be allowed further passage on the river. 

Once the convoy reached Al-Qurnah (Kurnah) it was assaulted by local pirates led by Sheikh Abu Saad, whose actions sank the main cargo ship and forced the four rafts aground shortly afterwards.  

The entire shipment was almost completely lost with only 28 of over 200 crates eventually making it to the Louvre in Paris.

Recovery efforts
Subsequent efforts to recover the lost antiquities, including a Japanese expedition in 1971-2, have largely been unsuccessful.

Notable sources
 Clément A. Transport des antiquités niniviennes de Bagdad à Bassorah. In: Le Globe. Revue genevoise de géographie, tome 5, 1866. pp. 170-183. DOI : 10.3406/globe.1866.6845
 Pillet, Maurice (1922). L'expédition scientifique et artistique de Mésopotamie et de Médie, 1851-1855 (in French). Paris: Éditions Champion

References

Shipwrecks
Shipwrecks containing antiquities